Raskuporis Cove is the 1.77 km wide cove indenting for 700 m the south coast of Byers Peninsula on Livingston Island in the South Shetland Islands, Antarctica.  Entered west of Sevar Point and east of Devils Point, and connected to Osogovo Bay to the northwest by the 20 m wide passage of Hell Gates.

The cove is named after King Raskuporis of Thrace, 48-42 BC.

Location
British mapping in 1968, Spanish in 1993 and Bulgarian in 2009.

Maps
 Península Byers, Isla Livingston. Mapa topográfico a escala 1:25000. Madrid: Servicio Geográfico del Ejército, 1992.
 L.L. Ivanov. Antarctica: Livingston Island and Greenwich, Robert, Snow and Smith Islands. Scale 1:120000 topographic map.  Troyan: Manfred Wörner Foundation, 2009.

References
 Raskuporis Cove. SCAR Composite Gazetteer of Antarctica.
 Bulgarian Antarctic Gazetteer. Antarctic Place-names Commission. (details in Bulgarian, basic data in English)

External links
 Raskuporis Cove. Copernix satellite image

Coves of Livingston Island
Bulgaria and the Antarctic